NA-115 (Sheikhupura-III) is a constituency for the National Assembly of Pakistan.

Area
During the delimitation of 2018, NA-121 (Sheikhupura-III) acquired areas from three former constituencies namely NA-133 (Sheikhupura-III), NA-134 (Sheikhupura-IV), and NA-136 (Nankana Sahib-II-cum-Sheikhupura), the areas of Sheikhupura District which are part of this constituency are listed below alongside the former constituency name from which they were acquired:

Areas acquired from NA-133 Sheikhupura-III
Municipal Corporation Sheikhupura
Following areas of Sheikhupura Tehsil
Sheikhupura Qanungo Halqa (excluding Ghazi Minara, Jhamkey, Machike, and Ghang)
Sahuki Malian

Areas acquired from NA-134 Sheikhupura-IV
Following areas of Sheikhupura Tehsil
Ghang
Ghazi Minara
Machike
Jandiala Sher Khan (excluding Jhabran, Isherke, Waran, and Kalo Ke)
Town Committee Jandiala Sher Khan

Areas acquired from NA-136 Nankana Sahib-II-cum-Sheikhupura
Following areas of Sheikhupura Tehsil
Bhikhi (excluding Malowal, Bahuman, and Hoeke)
Jevanpur Kalan

Members of Parliament

Since 2018: NA-121 Sheikhupura-III

Election 2018 

General elections were held on 25 July 2018.

See also
NA-114 Sheikhupura-II
NA-116 Sheikhupura-IV

References 

NA-121